Blidworth Welfare Football Club is a football club based in Blidworth, near Mansfield, Nottinghamshire, England.

History
Blidworth Welfare was initially formed in 1926 as Folk House Old Boys FC but changed to Blidworth Welfare FC in 1982. Since 2008, the club has played in the Central Midlands League until 2022 when they won promotion to the United Counties League. They first entered the FA Cup in the 1993–94 season.

In the beginning

Folk House Old Boys Football Club was formed in 1926 with the intentions being that it gave local miners and residents a football club in which they could play organised and competitive matches against other local football clubs.

Change to Blidworth Welfare FC

The 1982–83 season was a big one for the club as they changed their name to Blidworth Welfare FC and became founding members of the newly formed Northern Countries East League, a competition founded from the merging of the old Midlands Counties league and the Yorkshire League. Blidworth joined the Division One South of the NCEL when it was recognised starting in the 1984–85 season and then twelve months later the club joined the NCEL Division Three following further re-organisation of the leagues. The 1986–87 season saw the club leave the NCEL to join the Central Midlands League starting in their Premier Division, the move was a successful one as the club were soon promoted to the Supreme Division in 1990.

The 1990s and the FA England National Team Invitation

In 1994 Blidworth were promoted back to the Northern Counties East League for the following 94–95 season where they competed in Division One. It did not last long though as the club were relegated back to the Central Midlands Supreme Division at the end of the 97–98 season as they finished bottom. They lost all 28 league games, conceding 186 goals and scoring only eight in that season, a campaign so bad that The FA invited them to a training session with the England national football team. The club were invited to the FA's Lilleshall Centre of Excellence for a tour of the facilities and then the afternoon of training from England's coaches.

John Slater was in charge for the 1998–1999 season as the club were relegated to the lowest point of the football pyramid, the Central Midlands Premier Division. Slater resigned and the club were close to folding. At the last minute the club was rescued thanks to the efforts of Steve Spencer, who after initially spending time maintaining the ground decided to take over as the new first team manager. His efforts kept the club alive but despite the club boasting facilities capable of being used at a much higher level, the club struggled to attract the players to match it. The fact that the club is still alive today is solely down to Steve.

2000-10

The club had the facilities to play at a much higher level but were struggling to build a team capable of achieving the success it craved so in 2001 Rudy Funk a vibrant and influential local manager was appointed as the new first team manager by incoming new Chairman Alan Whitworth and the pair started the huge task of trying to turn the club around on and off the pitch.

Two Seasons of relative success and rebuilding followed but after Funks departure in 2003 Blidworth struggled in the league & cup competitions for a number of years under different management teams until in 2007 when under the management of Dave Hughes the club won the Nottinghamshire Intermediate Cup beating Bulwell FC 2–0 at Hucknall Town's Watnall Road Ground on a warm & sticky night in April. In 2007 the Central Midlands league was reshuffled and saw Blidworth move to the Supreme Division and again under the management of Dave Hughes the club reached the final of the Quartet Catering League Cup where they were unfortunate to lose 1–0 in extra time to Dunkirk, this defeat had followed an extraordinary cup run where Blidworth beat holders of the cup Heanor Town, league leaders and champions elect Askern Welfare, plus Holbrook Miners Welfare in the semi final.

After 2 fantastic seasons at the helm Dave Hughes reluctantly resigned as manager of the first team before the start of the 2008–09 season after his brother Rob was attacked whilst on holiday in Crete, the Manager felt he could not continue whilst his brother was in a serious medical condition in hospital. This resulted in Chairman Alan Whitworth appointing the management duo of Kevin Chappell & Keith Easom assisted by ex Blidworth player Simon Ward. The pair had previously worked together at Shirebrook Town looking after the Reserve & A sides. Easom had been a player at Shirebrook Town whilst Chappell had experienced football management at Worksop Town, Matlock Town, Matlock United and had been assistant to Rudy Funk during his days in charge at Blidworth. The club appointed Graeme Rodger & Chris Bullock to manage the reserve side that played in the Supreme Reserves Division of the Central Midlands League.

The first team had to manage without Kev Chappell during the second part of the season as ill health forced him to leave his role at the club so Easom ran the first team virtually on his own till the end of the season and managed to keep Blidworth in the Supreme Division finishing in a very respectable 14th position with the reserves finishing in 10th. The start of season 2009-10 saw Keith Easom promote Chris Bullock to join him as assistant manager with Graeme Rodger left to run the reserves alone. Stan Matthews a qualified Level 2 coach was appointed as the under 19's manager assisted by Chris Bullock.The season also saw the removal of the old wooden tea bar at the ground that had been in place since the club began, the management team purchased a redundant portable cabin which they developed into a more usable hospitality area.

In January 2010 the clubs old wooden changing rooms which had not been used for a number of months for health & safety reasons were demolished and the football club moved into the cricket pavilion until their own facilities were rebuilt. Plans & funding applications were well underway for a brand new football changing facility overseen by vice chairlady Helen Wilford which were hoped to be in place for the season after. Blidworth finished in 17th place at the end of season which was a respectable position considering the lack playing staff the manager had at his disposal but after this Keith Easom, Chris Bullock and Stan Matthews resigned from their positions at the club and it was then decided not to run an under 19 side for season 2010–11. Graeme Rodger had resigned from running the reserves in Feb 2010 so players Dave Voller & Jez Wright supported by former referee Darren Wragg stepped up to run the reserve side for the remainder of the season but despite a great effort they finished bottom of the Supreme Reserve Division.

2010-2020

Former Southwell City and Kirkby Town Manager Brett Marshall was appointed Blidworth First Team Manager for season 2010-11 assisted by Steve Roebuck. Marshall has had a successful playing career at clubs such as Retford United and can count Blidworth as one of his old teams. Ambitious to progress with a good knowledge of the game with the ability & reputation to attract the right players Blidworth were hoping Marshall's appointment would see them challenging for promotion at the end of the season. Former player Liam Best assisted by Darren Wragg were appointed by Marshall to run the reserve team. Best left the club after a few months due to work commitments so reserves captain Dave Voller stepped up to help Wragg to the end of the season which was a great success with the reserves finishing a credible 4th in the league whilst Marshall led the first team into runners up spot but only after a final day defeat to eventual champions Sheffield Parramore denied Blidworth the title.

In July 2011 after Marshall's departure to Retford United and also the sudden departure of Chairman Alan Whitworth after 12 years at the club saw Scott Ward and Dave Voller local, loyal servants to the club taking over the running of the club and first team. Working alongside Mick Gould as assistant manager the trio worked hard to rebuild the club from scratch bringing in a whole new squad & backroom staff including Chris Wain as grounds man but despite great efforts the team finished the season in 12th place in the CML South division after the league split to reduce travelling. The reserve team was scrapped for the season due to lack of funds but on a brighter note the club saw the return of an under 19 squad led by Martin Bower. Bower assisted by Kevin Heathcote brought a fine squad of players to the club and finished the season in 6th place along with a late quarter final defeat in the under 19's shield.

On 7 October 2012 the changing facilities at the new look Welfare Ground opened for use after local resident Don French took over the stalling project from Helen Wilford in September 2011 and within 10 months dug the first spade on site, a fantastic achievement for the club after nearly 3 seasons sharing the cricket pavilion. Gary Shelton joined the club as the new chairman with Dave Voller, Mick Gould and Mike Wain left to run the first team. Voller and Gould stepped down from their roles as the season began so Mike Wain brought in Richard Preston and Lee Cook to steady the ship. Wain & Preston left the club in November after a terrible start to the season leaving Cook along with Gareth Briggs & Scott McMillan the tough task of reviving the club's fortunes but unfortunately could not gain enough points to lift the club off the bottom of the table. Martin Bower & Kevin Heathcote ran the reinstated reserve team after impressing at under 19 level and finished the season in 3rd position.

Season 2013/14 saw Martin Bower & Kevin Heathcote promoted to run the first team after Cook, Briggs & McMillan left the club at the end of the season for Pinxton FC. The pair introduced local youth to the team but struggled to compete in a competitive league finishing 3rd from bottom. Scott Ward left the club in November 2013 for a role at Heanor Town FC but Paul Holmes, Andy North & Andy Ellis joined the club to run an under 19 squad and the reserve team, both sides produced some great results with a youth team squad fresh from winning the Mansfield Chad Under 16 league the year before. The under 19 squad finished 2nd behind Mansfield Town in a strong league and 5th place in the reserve premier division was a fantastic achievement using under the age of 18 players.

The season after saw big changes at the club, Bower & Heathcote moved to Pinxton FC and Holmes left football altogether so Rainworth MW reserve team manager Ady Smith bought his championship winning reserve squad to the Welfare Ground for the new season. Smith bought with him Ian Cotton from Sherwood Colliery to run the reserve team and the pair set about reviving the club's fortunes on the pitch. The season went well with first team finishing in an improved 7th place in the league after Smith left for Shirebrook Town midway through the season with players Rob Camm & Danny Bacon taking over. The real stars though were Cotton's reserve team who won the Reserve Premier Division title and the Reserve League Cup but lost in extra time to Thoresby CW reserves in the President's Cup final after extra time to deny them the treble, however Thoresby were later found to have played ineligible players in the game so the cup was handed to Blidworth by the league committee. Chairman Gary Shelton left the club on the last day of the season to pursue other interests.

The season 2015/16 saw Ian Cotton's treble winning reserve squad make the step up to challenge for honours in the CML South Division, Cotton bought in Ian Birtley to assist him and Jason Lilliman to run the reserve side, Rachael Swinney also joined the club as secretary replacing Pete Dean. Cotton's squad adapted well finishing 6th in the league and narrowly missed out on victory in the league cup with a late 2–1 defeat to Hucknall Rolls Leisure in the final. However the highlight of the season was the fantastic run in the FA vase where Cotton's squad beat higher league opposition twice before being made to replay St Andrews on a technicality and losing in extra time. The reserve team though struggled in the league finishing in 11th place with a very young squad before disbanding at the end of the season.

Season 2016/17 started where Blidworth left off the season before with Ian Cotton and Ian Birtley in charge of the first team. Scott Ward returned to the club as secretary and Dave Voller rejoined as chairman to guide the club forward. The campaign started slowly but began to gain momentum with key players returning from injury and suspension along with the return of ex manager Michael Wain as coach. Again Blidworth fared well in the FA Vase beating higher league opponents Teversal, Shirebrook Town and Heanor Town before losing to a late goal from AFC Mansfield in the second round of the competition in front of an impressive 146 spectators at the Welfare Ground. Cotton, Wain and Birtley all left the club in February 2017 to save Cotton's home town club Clipstone from folding so Goalkeeper Steve Smith stepped up and took over the manager's role guiding the club to a 12 place finish.

In the summer of 2017 Scott Ward and Chris Wain again started to rebuild the club from the bottom, with stability a big factor in their decision the pair appointed Lewis Saxby as first team manager after Steve Smith had stepped down from temporary charge after the last game of the season at Southwell City. Saxby brought in Dan Machin and Dan Hatfield as his assistants along with Keiran Booker as Media Manager to help promote the club. Saxby brought in a whole new squad of players to start the 2017/18 season in the CML South but promised to use the club's youth system to blood local talent in men's football so asked Blidworth Welfare Junior chairman Adam Gullett to join his coaching staff. Saxby used the season to build a competitive squad and finished in a very respectable 7th place in a tough South division.

Season 2018/19 saw Lewis Saxby, Dan Machin and Adam Gullett attempt to build on their good start to life at Blidworth by resigning most of the squad that ended the previous campaign. The introduction of a new midweek Under 21 team at the Welfare Ground managed by Lee Richardson and his coach Adam Gullett gave the manager an avenue to blood young local talent in men's football and support his squad on Saturdays. Saxby left Blidworth in October after 9 straight wins after being tempted by Rainworth MW to try his luck at step 6, most of the squad left with the manager so Chairman Chris Wain appointed Scott Rogers as the new first team manager assisted by Danny Staley and Richard Hannigan who brought in a young team to fight the cause until the end of the season finishing a credible 7th place in a tough CMFL South division.

Season 2019/20 saw young local manager Scott Rogers again in charge at the Welfare Ground for what would be his first full season at the club, Richard Hannigan again assisted Rogers but Danny Staley left the club to return to Kimberley MW. Local UEFA Badged coach Dean Mitchell replaced Staley and all 3 attempted to produce a young team that could be competitive in the CMFL. The season was going well until Rogers received a 4-month ban from the game in November and resigned as manager. Richard Hannigan stepped up to the role as manager and along with Mitchell guided the club into the top 6 before the season ended prematurely in March with 10 games to play due to COVID-19.

2020-present
Season 20/21 started in September due to COVID-19 with Richard Hannigan continuing as First Team Manager and Dean Mitchell as First Team Coach. Hannigan brought Steve Smith back to the club as his Assistant from Rainworth MW and the 3 embarked on adding to an already good, young squad to compete in a strong CMFL South division. A stop start season was finally abolished in April 2021 after 4 months of inactivity due to the global pandemic with Blidworth unbeaten and top of the table. The CMFL however did arrange an end of season champions league style tournament for clubs to play out the final months.

Season 21/22 after phase 2 of the drainage work was completed on the pitch by Chairman Chris Wain saw Hannigan, Smith and Mitchell pick up where they left off after re-signing all but one of the previous season's unbeaten squad. The club has also restarted a reserve team to support the manager in the development of the clubs young players lead by Nigel Dobney. The first team won the CMFL South Division title finishing 4 points clear of Mickleover FC gaining promotion to Step 6 of the football pyramid, a fantastic achievement and the first time Blidworth had won a trophy in over 15 years. The reserve side finished a credible 6th in the table in their first ever season in men's football using mostly under 19 players.

Staff
 Chairman – Chris Wain
 Vice Chairman – Daren Fowler
 Club Secretary – Scott Ward
 Club Treasurer – Scott Ward
 Committee – Dave Rogers
 Gate Man – Andrew Pitt

Timeline 
1926    Club formed as Folk House Old Boys
1981–82 Changed name to Blidworth Welfare
1982–83 Founder members of Northern Counties East League
1984–85 Joined Division One South on re-organisation
1985–86 Joined Division Three on re-organisation. (Failed to complete fixtures – record expunged)
1986–97 Joined Central Midlands League Premier Division
1990–91 Elevated to Supreme Division
1994–95 Rejoined Northern Counties East League in Division One
1998–99 Rejoined Central Midlands League Supreme Division
1998–99 Demoted to Premier Division
2006–07 Won Nottinghamshire Intermediate Cup
2011–12 Joined Central Midlands League South Division on re-organisation
2021–22 Central Midlands League South Division Champions
2022–23 Promoted to United Counties Division One

Records
FA Cup
 First qualifying round 1996-97
FA Vase
 Second round 2016-17
 Second round 2018-19

References 

Blidworth Welfare at Groundhoppers View

External links

Football clubs in England
Football clubs in Nottinghamshire
Association football clubs established in 1926
Central Midlands Football League
1926 establishments in England
Mining association football teams in England
Blidworth
United Counties League